Chilomycterus is a genus of diodontid tetraodontiform fishes commonly called "burrfish."

Species
There are currently 5 recognized species in this genus:
 Chilomycterus antennatus (G. Cuvier, 1816) (Bridled burrfish)
 Chilomycterus antillarum D. S. Jordan & Rutter, 1897 (Web burrfish)
 Chilomycterus mauretanicus (Y. Le Danois, 1954) (Guinean burrfish)
 Chilomycterus reticulatus (Linnaeus, 1758) (Spotfin burrfish)
 Chilomycterus schoepfii (Walbaum, 1792) (Striped burrfish)
 Chilomycterus spinosus (Linnaeus, 1758)

References

 
Marine fish genera
Taxa named by Charles N. F. Brisout